Mynydd Mechell is an area in the  community of Mechell, Anglesey, Wales, which is 141.9 miles (228.4 km) from Cardiff and 223.8 miles (360.2 km) from London.

References

See also
List of localities in Wales by population

Villages in Anglesey